John Hallam (1941–2006) was a British character actor who appeared prolifically in minor roles on stage, television and in film, with occasional major roles such as Thomas Mallen in the Granada series The Mallens. This article lists all the films and television productions in which Hallam has appeared and the roles he played.

Filmography

Film

Television

Male actor filmographies
British filmographies